The World Correspondence Chess Championship determines the World Champion in correspondence chess. Men and women of any age are eligible to contest the title. The official World Correspondence Chess Championship is managed by the International Correspondence Chess Federation (ICCF).

The world championship comprises four stages: Preliminaries, Semi-Finals, Candidates' Tournament, and Final. ICCF tournament rules define which players can access each stage. The first-, second- and third-placed finishers from the previous Final, and the first- and second-placed finishers from the Candidates' Tournaments have access to the World Correspondence Chess Championship Final.

The ICCF also manages the Ladies World Correspondence Chess Championships, that comprises Semi-Finals and Final.

World Champions
Dates given are the period in which the final of the championship took place, as given on the ICCF website.

Ladies World Champions

ICCF World Cup

ICCF Chess 960 World Cup

See also
World Chess Championship

References 

Correspondence chess
Chess competitions